The Primary Alerting System (PAS), was a network of land-line connections used by the Strategic Air Command (SAC) for command and control of its nuclear forces. PAS provided immediate and simultaneous voice communications to all (SAC) unit command posts and missile launch control facilities.

 

PAS reached each Command Post by two geographically diversified circuits; one circuit, commonly called the "front-door" circuit tied the unit directly to Headquarters (SAC); the other, or "back-door" circuit provided a link to the parent Numbered Air Force.

See also
Post Attack Command and Control System (PACCS)
Airborne Launch Control System (ALCS)
Ground Wave Emergency Network (GWEN)
Minimum Essential Emergency Communications Network (MEECN)
Survivable Low Frequency Communications System (SLFCS)

References

Telecommunications equipment of the Cold War
United States nuclear command and control
Equipment of Strategic Air Command